The Cardenas Basalt, also known as either the Cardenas Lava or Cardenas Lavas, is a rock formation that outcrops over an area of about 310 km2 (120 mi2) in the eastern Grand Canyon, Coconino County, Arizona. The lower part of the Cardenas Basalt forms granular talus slopes. Its upper part forms nearly continuous low cliffs that are parallel to the general course of the Colorado River. The most complete, readily accessible, and easily studied exposure of the Cardenas Basalt lies in Basalt Canyon. This is also its type locality.

The Cardenas Basalt is part of the Unkar Group. The Grand Canyon Supergroup, of which the Unkar Group is the lowermost part, overlies deeply eroded granites, gneisses, pegmatites, and schists that comprise Vishnu Basement Rocks.

The Cardenas Basalt has also been called the Rama Formation. However this name, which was originally applied to the dikes and sills intruding strata underlying the Cardenas Basalt has been formally abandoned in the geological literature.

Description
It consists of complexly interbedded, thin, and discontinuous beds of basalt, hyaloclastite, and sandstone. The lava within this unit consists of pahoehoe lava flows of olivine-rich basalt. Within the lower part of the Cardenas Basalt, the lava is highly altered and might have been glassy at one time. Near the top of the lower unit the basalt is more massive and less altered. The hyaloclastite is highly altered, and contains secondary chlorite, epidote, talc, and zeolites. Although this unit is highly altered and weathered, many of the primary features are preserved. Thin discontinuous sandstone beds are interbedded with lava flows and hyaloclastite. The brown, maroon, purple sandstones consist of texturally immature, planar-bedded, poorly sorted quartz and feldspar in a matrix of mica and clay. The coarser grains range from medium sand to silt.

The upper unit of the Cardenas Basalt is a series of cliff-forming basaltic and andesitic lava flows that are interbedded with beds of breccia, sandstone, and lapillite. Some of the lava flows are fan-jointed, ropy, and have porphyritic to aphanitic and vesicular textures. The sandstones within the upper part of the Cardenas Basalt contain eroded fragments of lava and have been baked by overlying lava flows. The lapillite bed ranges in thickness from a few meters to several tens of meters and consists of scoriaceous lapilli, volcanic blocks, and volcanic bombs.

The basaltic and andesitic dikes and sills that occur within the strata underlying the Cardenas Basalt are similar in mineralogy and chemistry to the Cardenas volcanic rocks. This suggests that these intrusive and extrusive rocks are coeval and share a common source. The sills range in thickness from a few tens of meters to as thick as 300 m. The dikes typically are much thinner and locally follow fault planes.

Nature of contacts
The basal contact of the Cardenas Basalt with the underlying Dox Formation is smooth, planar, parallel to bedding and locally interfingering. In places the sandstones of the Dox Formation have small folds and convolutions that are indicative of soft sediment deformation. In addition, in places, the uppermost  of the Dox Formation is mildly baked. A thin lava flow occurs within the uppermost part of the Dox Formation. Thus, the contact between the Cardenas Lavas and the Dox Formation is conformable and interfingering. This indicates that sands were still being deposited when the first lavas erupted and that deposition occurred during the transition from the accumulation of Dox Formation to Cardenas Basalt.

The contact between the Cardenas Basalt and the overlying Nankoweap Formation is an erosion surface that is a disconformity or even a slight angular unconformity. Locally, the contact is a low relief erosional surface associated with a thin weathering zone developed in the lavas of the Cardenas Basalt. Along the length of the outcrop of this unconformity, it cuts as much as  down into the Cardenas Basalt. The lowest part of the Nankoweap Formation consists of a basal conglomerate that is composed chiefly of gravel derived from the Cardenas Basalt.

The contact between the Tapeats Sandstone and the Cardenas Basalt and rest of the folded and faulted Unkar Group is a prominent angular unconformity. The differential erosion of the Unkar Group left resistant beds of the Cardenas Basalt and Shinumo Quartzite as topographic highs, ancient monadnocks, that are now buried by sandstones, shales, and conglomerates of the Tonto Group. These monadnocks served locally as sources of coarse-grained sediments during the marine transgression that deposited the Tapeats Sandstone and other members of the Tonto Group.

Fossils
No fossils have been reported from the sediments interbedded within the Cardenas Basalt.

Depositional environment
The lava flows of the Cardenas Basalt represent the subaerial eruption of basaltic and andesitic magma. The interbedded sandstones and hyaloclastites provide evidence that these eruptions occurred in wet coastal environments such as river deltas or tidal flats. The coarseness of the lapillites in the upper unit indicates that the volcanic vents from which this material erupted were close to present day outcrops. The character of the individual flow units suggest that the volcanic strata accumulated at a slightly greater rate than basin subsidence.

Age
Geologists have attempted to date the Cardenas Basalt for many years. On the basis of other geologic criteria, geologists have found that the dates, which range from 700 to 1,000 million years ago, obtained for the age of the Cardenas Basalt and upper age of the Unkar Group were too young and something was clearly perturbing the dating systematics. The current interpretation is that the deposition of the overlying Chuar Group in a marine setting disrupted the potassium-argon (K-Ar) radiometric system. Apparently, fluids associated with the deposition of the Chuar Group have altered the older Cardenas Basalt, partially degraded the minerals, and therefore disrupted the K-Ar systematics. Using newer dating techniques and approaches not available to earlier geologists, the Cardenas Basalt and intrusive sills have been re-dated. New data acquired using newer dating techniques and approaches, indicate that the Cardenas Basalt erupted about 1,104 million years ago. This date marks the end of Unkar time.

Tanner Trail, Lava Butte

The Tanner Trail from Desert View point region to the Colorado River, has views north to the Colorado River and Lava Butte, which is made of the Cardenas Basalt and is one of the ancient topographic highs (monadnocks) and lies directly north. Temple Butte, the Palisades of the Desert, is on the East Rim, to the right (east) of Lava Butte. The buttes lie on the west bank of the Colorado River as it flows due-south on the east, southeast side of the Kaibab Plateau, (Cape Royal at Walhalla Plateau). The Colorado River immediately turns due-west here to soon enter the Granite Gorge region (East Inner Gorge), which is made up of the Vishnu Basement Rocks.

Gallery

See also
 Geology of the Grand Canyon area
 Great Unconformity
 Tanner Graben

References

External links 

 Anonymous (2011) Cardenas Lava U.S. Geological Survey, Reston, Virginia.
 Bell, B., and D. Brown (2012) The interplay of terrestrial volcanism and shoreface sedimentation. School of Geography and Earth Sciences, University of Glasgow, Glasgow, Scotland, United Kingdom.
 Hartman, J. H. (2001)Cardenas Butte section, Grand Canyon National Park, Arizona. GeoDIL, A Geoscience Digital Image Library, University of North Dakota, Grand Forks, North Dakota.
 Keller, B., (2012) The Cardenas Lava, Overview of the Grand Canyon Supergroup, Grand Hikes, Bob's Rock Shop.
 Mathis, A., and C. Bowman (2007) The Grand Age of Rocks: The Numeric Ages for Rocks Exposed within Grand Canyon, National Park Service, Grand Canyon National Park, Arizona.
 Stamm, N. (2011) Geologic Unit: Cardenas, U.S. Geological Survey, Reston, Virginia.
 Timmons, M., K. Karlstrom, and C. Dehler (1999) Grand Canyon Supergroup Six Unconformities Make One Great Unconformity A Record of Supercontinent Assembly and Disassembly. Boatman's Quarterly Review. vol. 12, no. 1, pp. 29–32.
 Timmons, S. S. (2003) Learning to Read the Pages of a Book (Grand Canyon Geology Training Manual), National Park Service, Grand Canyon National Park, Arizona.

Basalt
Mesoproterozoic geology
Geologic formations of Arizona
Natural history of the Grand Canyon
Precambrian United States
Lava flows
Mesoproterozoic volcanism